This is a list of defunct newspapers of the United States. Only notable names among the thousands of such newspapers are listed, primarily major metropolitan dailies which published for ten years or more.

The list is sorted by distribution and state and labeled with the city of publication if not evident from the name.

Note that there are lists of newspapers in every state, such as List of newspapers in Alabama, each with a section on defunct newspapers in the state. These lists often include titles missing below.

National
 Daily Worker
 The National
 National Anti-Slavery Standard (1840–1870) 
 The National Era (1847-1860, abolitionist)
 Negro World
 Police Gazette (1845-1977)
 The Spotlight (1975-2001)

Metropolitan and local

Alabama

 Alabama Journal (Montgomery) (1940–1993)

 Birmingham Post-Herald (1850–2005)

 Daily Rebel (Selma) (1865)

 The Hoover Gazette (2006–2007)

 The Meteor Alabama Insane Hospital (1872–1881)

 The Mobile Morning News (c.1865)

Alaska
 Anchorage Times
 Insurgent49 
 Tundra Times

Arizona
 Ádahooníłígíí
 The Argus (Holbrook, Arizona) (1895–1900)
 The Bachelor's Beat
 Bisbee Daily Review (Bisbee, Arizona) (1901–1971)
 The Border Vidette (Nogales, Arizona) (1894-1934)
 El Fronterizo (Tucson) (1878-193?)
 The Holbrook News (Holbrook, Arizona)
 Mohave County Miner (Mineral Park, Arizona, 1882-1887; Kingman, Arizona, 1887-1974), called Mohave County Miner and Our Mineral Wealth between 1918 (after merger with Our Mineral Wealth) and 1922.
 Our Mineral Wealth (Kingman, Arizona, 1893-1918), merged with Mohave County Miner in 1918.
 Phoenix Gazette (1881–1997)
 The Rep
 The St. Johns Herald (1885-1903, 1917-1938), Snips and St. Johns Herald (1903-1905), St. Johns Herald and Apache News (1905-1917), St. Johns Herald-Observer (1938-1946), Apache County Independent-News and Herald-Observer (1946-1956)
 Tucson Citizen (1870–2009)
 Weekly Arizonian
 Williams News (Williams, Arizona)

Arkansas
 Arkansas Gazette (Little Rock) (1819–1991)

California
 Alameda Times-Star
 Anaheim Bulletin 
 The Argus (Fremont)
 Beverly Hills Post
 Burbank Daily Review 
 Weekly Butte Democrat, Oroville, 1859–1862
 California Eagle (Los Angeles)
 The Californian (San Francisco)
 Chung Sai Yat Po (San Francisco, Chinese)
 Clovis Independent
 Hayward Daily Review
 Daily Star-Progress (La Habra) 
 Dinuba Sentinel
 Evening Outlook (Santa Monica)
 Fortuna Advance (Fortuna) (existed in 1905)
 Fullerton News-Tribune 
 The Golden Era (San Francisco)
 Hokubei Mainichi Newspaper (San Francisco, Japanese)
 Hollywood Citizen (1931–1970)
 Hollywood Star
 Los Angeles Illustrated Daily News
 Los Angeles Examiner (1903–1962)
 Los Angeles Herald-Examiner (1962–1989)
 Los Angeles Herald Express (1931–1962)
 Los Angeles Mirror
 Los Angeles Record 
 Los Angeles Saturday Night (1920–1934, illustrated weekly by Samuel Travers Clover)
 Napa Sentinel
 The Nevada Journal (Nevada City)
 Nichi Bei Times (San Francisco, Japanese)
 North County Times (Escondido)
 Oakland Tribune
 OC Weekly
 Oxnard Press-Courier 
 Progress Bulletin (Pomona)
 Sacramento Union (1851–1994)
 San Bruno Herald
 San Diego Daily Journal (1944–1950)
 San Francisco Bay Guardian
 San Francisco Call (1856–1913)
 San Francisco Evening Bulletin (1929–1959)
 The San Francisco News (1903–1959)
 San Mateo County Times
 San Mateo Daily News
 Sanger Herald
 Viet Mercury (San Jose, Vietnamese)

Colorado
 Cherry Creek Pioneer (Denver) (1859)
 Colorado Mountaineer Established 1875
 Colorado Springs Sun
 Rocky Mountain News (Denver) (1859–2009)
 Rolling Stock (Boulder)

Connecticut

 Bridgeport Evening Farmer (1866–1917)
 Farmington Valley Herald 
 The Hartford Times (1817–1976)
 Manchester Herald 
 The Meriden Journal 
 The New Haven Courier 
 Waterbury Democrat 
 Winsted Evening Citizen

Delaware
 The Wilmington Mercury (1798)

Florida
 Boca Raton News
 The Clearwater Sun (1914–1989) 
 Evening Independent (1906–1986)
 Jacksonville Journal
 The Miami News (1896–1988)
 Pasco News
 Sarasota Journal (1952–1982)
 Tampa Times (1893–1982)
 Tampa Tribune

Georgia
 Atlanta Georgian (1906–1939)
 Atlanta Southern Confederacy
 Cherokee Phoenix  (1828–1834)
 Daily Intelligencer (Atlanta)
 Daily Sun
 The Great Speckled Bird (Atlanta) (1968–1976)
 The Luminary

Hawaii
 Hawaii Holomua (Honolulu) (1891–1895)
 Hilo Tribune (1895–1917)
 The Honolulu Advertiser (1856–2010)
 Honolulu Star-Bulletin (1882–2010)
 Honolulu Weekly
 Molokai Island Times
 Pacific Commercial Advertiser (Honolulu) (1856–1888)
 Polynesian (Honolulu) (1844–1864)

Idaho
 Bingham County News (Blackfoot) (1918–1930)
 Blackfoot Optimist (1907–1918)
 Camas Prairie Chronicle (Cottonwood) (1901–1917)
 Idaho Falls Free Press 
 Idaho Observer (1997–2010)

Illinois
 Champaign-Urbana Courier
 Chicago Daily News (1875–1978)
 The Chicago Day Book (1911–1917)
 Chicago Democrat (1857)
 Chicago Evening Post
 Chicago Inter Ocean
 Chicago Press and Tribune (1857)
 Chicago Times
 Chicago's American (1900-1939)
 Commercial Bulletin (Troy)
 Congregational Herald (Chicago) (1857)
 Daily Commercial Bulletin (Chicago)
 Dziennik Narodowy (Chicago) (1899–1923)
 Free West 
 Idisher ḳuryer : The Daily Jewish Courier (Chicago) (1887-194?)
 Metro-East Journal (East St. Louis)
 The Northwestern Lumberman, Chicago
 Pochodeň (Chicago) (1896–1899)
 Post Amerikan (Bloomington-Normal)
 Skandinaven (Chicago)
 Springfield Republican-American 
 Telegraf (Chicago) (1892-19??)
 Vorbote (Chicago) (1874–1924)
 Western Citizen (Chicago) (1850s)

Indiana
 Amateur Reporter (Washington) (1882–1883)
 The Andrews Signal (1893–1952)
 Blackford County Democrat (Hartford City) (1857–1861) 
 Blackford County Gazette (Hartford City) (1901–1905)
 Blackford County News (Hartford City) (1852–1859) 
 Brookville American (1858–1861)
 Carthage Record (18??-190?)
 The Colored Visitor (Logansport) (1879-18??)
 Daily Gazette (Hartford City) (1901–1903) 
 Daily Journal (Hartford City) (1909–1915) 
 The Daily Republican (Seymour) (?-1899)
 The DePauw Daily (Greencastle) (?-1920)
 Daily State Sentinel (Indianapolis) (1861–1884)
 The Disseminator (New Harmony) (1828–1841)
 Evansville Press (1906–1998)
 Evening News (Hartford City) (1894–1937) 
 Fort Wayne World (1884–1885)
 The Freeman (Indianapolis) (1884–1927)
 Gary Tribune/Gary Daily Tribune (1914–1921)
 Hagerstown Exponent (1876–2004)
 Hartford City Arena (1891–1895) 
 Hartford City Courier (1873–1875) 
 Hartford City Democrat (1869–1872) 
 Hartford City Press (1892–1894) 
 Hartford City Telegram (1875–1914) 
 Hartford City Times (1852–?) 
 Hartford City Times (1885–1905) 
 Hartford City Union (1861–1871)  
 The Hazleton Herald (1896–?)
 The Hazleton News (c.1888)
 The Herald (Lynn) (?-192?)
 Hoosier Topics (Cloverdale) (19??-????)
 Indiana Palladium (Lawrenceburg) (1825–1836)
 Indiana-Posten (South Bend) (1899–?)
 Indiana State Sentinel (Indianapolis) (1845–1851)
 Indiana Tribüne (Indianapolis) (1878–1907)
 Indianapolis Daily Herald (1865–1868)
 Indianapolis Journal (1867–1904)
 Indianapolis Leader (1879–1890)
 Indianapolis Ledger (1912–19??)
 Indianapolis News (1869–1999)
 Indianapolis Sentinel (1880–1904)
 Indianapolis Times  (1888–1965)
 Indianapolis World (188?–19??) 
 Irvington Review and Irvingtonian (Indianapolis) (1937–1939)
 Jamestown Tribune (18??-18??)
 Jasper Weekly Courier (1858–1922)
 Jedność (Gary) (1975-19??)
 Kosciusko Co. Standard (Leesburg) (188?–1???)
 Kurjer (Gary) (1937–????)
 La Porte Chronicle (1874–1880)
 Lake City Commercial (Warsaw) (1859–1860)
 Leesburg Journal (Leesburg) (19??-19??)
 Leesburg News (1939–1999)
 Lyons Herald (c.1939)
 Marshall County Democrat (1855–1859)
 Marshall County Republican (Plymouth) (1856–1878)
 Messenger Crier (Crawfordsville) (19??-????)
 The Microscope and General Advertiser (New Albany) (1824–1825)
 Muncietown Telegraph (1841–1842)
 Nasze życie (East Chicago) (1936-19??)
 The National Republican (Muncie) (1914–1925)
 New Albany Daily Ledger (1849–1871)
 New-Harmony Gazette (1825–1828)
 Newport Hoosier State (1890–1895)
 News (Hartford City) (1873–1885)
 Noble County Herald (Albion) (1860–1866)
 The Paper (Elkhart) (?-2000)
 Plymouth Banner (1852–1855)
 Plymouth Democrat (1869–1941)
 Plymouth Tribune (1901–1911) 
 Randolph County Journal (Winchester) (1855–1862)
 Record-Herald (Butler) (1928–1977)
Register (Hartford City) (1856)
 Republican (Hartford City) (1895–1896) 
 Richmond Palladium (Richmond) (1831–1837)
 Rockport Democrat
 Rockport Journal 
 Rockport Weekly Democrat (1855–?)
 The Sandborn Herald (Sandborn) (1905–?)
 Saturday Siftings (Hartford City) (1891–<1894) 
 The Semi-Weekly Dispatch (Winslsow) (?-1904)
 Shelby Democrat (1???-1947)
 Smithville News (1908–19??)
 The Statesman, and Clark County Advertiser (Charlestown) (18??-18??)
 Terre Haute Advocate (?-197?)
 Times-Gazette (Hartford City) (1905–1937)
 Trainman (Indianapolis) (1947–1968)
 Vincennes Gazette (1830–1844)
 Wabash Express (Terre Haute) (1841-186?)
 Walton Enterprise (192?–19??)
 Weekly Post (Bethlehem) (1892-1???)
 Winchester Journal (18??-1920)

Iowa
 Cerro Gordo County Republican (Mason City) (1893–1906)
 Cresco Plain Dealer (Cresco) (1913–1945)
 Decorah Posten
 Delaware County News (Manchester) (1896–1912)
 Der Demokrat (Davenport) (186?–1868)
 Denison Herald 
 Des Moines Tribune (1906–1982)
 Evening Times-Republican (Marshalltown) (1890–1923)
 Express-Republican (Mason City) (1886–1893)
 Iowa State Bystander (Des Moines) (1894–1916)
 Manchester Democrat (1875–1930)
 Manchester Democrat-Radio (1930–1988)
 Mason City Express (1870–1886)
 Ottumwa Tri-Weekly Courier (1903–1916)
 Political Beacon (Lawrenceburg) (1837–1845)
 Sioux City Tribune
 Der tägliche Demokrat (Davenport) (186?–1918)

Kansas
 The Commercial Bulletin (Lane)
 Topeka State Journal (1892–1980)

Kentucky
 The Adair County News
 Big Sandy News (Louisa) (1885–1929)
  Hartford Republican (18??-1926) 
 The Independent Press (Whitesville) (?-1870)
 The Jeffersonian
 Kentucky Irish American
 The Kentucky Post
 The Louisville Herald-Post
 The Louisville Leader
 The Louisville Times (1884–1987)
 The Whitesville Independent Press (1989–1991)

Louisiana
 Avoyelles Pelican (Marksville) (1859-186?)
 Baton-Rouge Gazette (1819–1856)
 Baton Rouge State-Times (1904–1991)
 Bogalusa Enterprise (1914–18)
 Gazette and Sentinel (Plaquemine) (1858–1864)
 Houma Courier (1878–1939)
 Lafayette Advertiser (1865-19??)
 Louisiana Cotton-Boll (Lafayette) (1872–1883)
 Le Louisianais (Convent) (1865–1883)
 Lower Coast Gazette (Pointe à la Hache) (1909–1925)
 The Lumberjack (Alexandria) (1913–1913)
 The Meridional (Abbeville) (1856–1906)
 Le Meschacébé (Lucy) (1853–1942) 
 Le Messager (Bringier) (1846–1860)
 Natchitoches Union (1859–1864)
 New Iberia Enterprise (1885–1902)
 L'Abeille (The New Orleans Bee)
 New Orleans States-Item (1958–1980)
 New-Orleans Commercial Bulletin (1832 to 1871)
 Opelousas Courier (1852–1910)
 Opelousas Journal (1868–1878)
 Opelousas Patriot (1855–1863) 
 El Pelayo (New Orleans) (1851–1852)
 Pioneer of Assumption (Napoleonville) (185?–1895)
 Planters' Banner (Franklin) (1849–1872)
 Pointe Coupee Democrat (New Roads) (1858–1862)
 La Sentinelle de Thibodaux (1861–1866)
The Shreveport Journal (1897–1991)
 The Voice of the People (New Orleans) (1913–19??)
 Weekly Louisianian (New Orleans) (1872–1882)

Maine
 Evening Express (Portland) (1882–1991)
 The Maine Times (Portland) 
 The Journal Tribune (Biddeford)

Maryland
 Allegheny Citizen (Frostburg) (1950–1961)
 Annapolis Gazette (1855–1874)
 Annapolis News (1940–1952)
 Baltimore American (1796–1964)
 Baltimore Chronicle
 Baltimore Evening Herald 
 Baltimore Evening Sun
 Baltimore Examiner
 Baltimore Morning Herald
 Baltimore News (1873–1936)
 Baltimore News-American (1864–1986)
 Baltimore News-Post (1936–1964)
 Baltimore Patriot 
 Baltimore Post (1922–1936)
 Bethesda Tribune 
 Brooklyn-Curtis Bay Town Crier (Baltimore) 
 Brooklyn News (Baltimore) 
 Citizen (Cumberland) (1961–1982)
 Cumberland Freie Presse (1891–1896)
 Cumberland News (1865–1869)
 Cumberland Times-News (1987–2009)
 The Daily Mail (Hagerstown)
 Daily News (Cumberland) (1890–1896) 
 Der Deutsche correspondent (Baltimore) (1841–1918)
 Elkton Press (1823-183?)
 The Enterprise (Federal Hill) 
 Frostburg Mining Journal (1871–1911)
 The Frederick Post 
 Genius of Universal Emancipation (Baltimore) (1823–1839)
 Maryland Herald & Elizabeth-Town Advertiser (Hagerstown) (1797–1801)
 Montgomery Journal
 Mountain City Times (Cumberland) (1865–1869)
 The Morning Herald (Hagerstown)
 Maryland Advocate & Farmer's & Mechanics Register (Cumberland) (1831–1835)
 The News (Frederick) 
 Northwest Star (Pikesville) (1966–1988)
 Owings Mill Times (1986–2006)
 Pioneer (Dundalk) (1938)
 Rockville Times
 Silver Spring Suburban Record 
 The South  (Baltimore)
 The Washington Spy (Hagerstown) (1790–1797)

 Weekly Civilian (Cumberland) (1892–1897)
 Western Maryland Voice of Industrial Labor (Cumberland) (1938–1942)

Massachusetts

 Boston Chronicle
 Boston Courier (1824–1915)
 The Boston Daily Advertiser (1862) 
 Boston Evening-Post (1735-1775)
 Boston Evening Transcript (1830-1941)
 Boston Gazette
 The Boston Journal  
 The Boston News-Letter
 Boston Phoenix
 Boston Post (1831-1956)
 Boston Post-Boy (1734–1754, 1757–1775)
 The Boston Record (1884–1961)
 Boston Traveler (1845–1967)
 Columbian Centinel
 Editorial Humor
 Essex Gazette 
 Gwiazda
 Holyoke Transcript-Telegram
 La Justice
 The Liberator (1831–1865, abolitionist, Boston)
 The Lowell Courier 
 Massachusetts Gazette 
 Massachusetts Spy
 Neu England Rundschau
 New England Chronicle 
 Plymouth Rock and County Advertiser (Plymouth)
 Provincetown Advocate 
 Publick Occurrences Both Foreign and Domestick (Boston)
 Village Voice (Assonet) 
 Weekly Journal (East Freetown)

Michigan
 The Bay City Journal, Bay City, Michigan
 Birmingham, Eccentric, Birmingham Circulation was just in excess of 6,000.  It ceased print publication in December 2022.
 Bloomfield-Birmingham Eccentric Newspaper
 Bronson Journal, Bronson ceased publication on Nov. 16, 2017.
 Copper Island News, Hancock 
 Copper Island Sentinel, Calumet 
 Daily Chronicle, Marshall (1879–1907)
 The Dearborn Independent (1919–27)
 Detroit Sunday Journal
 Detroiter Abend-Post, Detroit (1876–1929)
 Detroit Times (1900-1960)
 The Flint Flashes, Flint
 The Grand Traverse Herald, Traverse City 
 The Herald Press, St. Joseph 
 The Hillsdale Standard, Hillsdale 
 Hillsdale Whig Standard, Hillsdale 
 The Livonia Observer, Livonia, Michigan, ceased printing in December 2022, but an online edition persists.  That paper had an circulation of over 14,000.  It was part of a larger slaughter of local newspapers.  Gannett shut six newspapers down in a stroke.  "The publisher said publications will continue online and there were no new layoffs associated with the print finale. Currently are only five reporters to cover the communities that number about one million people. Gannett said  they will maintain print editions in Northville, Novi, Milford and South Lyon."
 Iosco County Gazette Index, Iosco County 
 Iron Ore, Ishpeming
 Mason County Record, Ludington
 Metro Community Newspapers, Livonia 
 The Michigan Tradesman, Petoskey 
 Saginaw Daily Journal, Saginaw
 St Joseph Herald, Saint Joseph 
 St Joseph Traveler Herald, Saint Joseph 
 The Weekly Press, Saint Joseph

Minnesota

 The Appeal (Saint Paul, Minnesota) (1889-19??)
 Bemidji Daily Pioneer (1904–1971)
 Echo de l'Ouest (Minneapolis) (1883–1929)
 Der fortschritt (New Ulm) (1891–1915)
 Katolik (Winona) (1893–1895)
 Minneapolis Evening Journal
 Minneapolis Star (1947–1982)
 Minneapolis-Tidende
 Minneapolis Times
 Minneapolis Tribune
 Minnesota Posten
 New Ulm Post (New Ulm) (1864–1933)
 Northwest Commercial Bulletin (Saint Paul)
 Der Nordstern (St. Cloud) (1874–1931)
 The Progress (White Earth) (1886–1889)
 Red Lake News (Red Lake) (1912–1921) 
 Staats-Zeitung (Saint Paul) (1858–1877)
 St. Paul Dispatch (1868–1984)
 The Tomahawk (White Earth) (1903-192?)
 Twin City Commercial Bulletin
 Vinland (Minneota) (1902–1908)
 Western Appeal (Saint Paul, Minnesota) (1885-18??)
 Wiarus (Winona) (1895–1919)

Mississippi
 Capitol Reporter

Missouri
 Daily Commercial Bulletin and Missouri Literary Register (1836–1838)
 Daily Commercial Bulletin (1838–1841)
 Die Gasconade Zeitung (Hermann) (1873-187?)
 Evening and Morning Star
 Hermanner Volksblatt u. Gasconade Zeitung (Hermann) (1872–1873)
 Hermanner Volksblatt (Hermann) (1875–1928) 
 Kansas City Journal-Post (1854–1942)
 Kansas City Times (1867–1990)
 Missouri Democrat St. Louis (1858) 
 Osage County Volksblatt (Westphalia) (1896-1917)
 St. Louis Commercial Bulletin and Missouri Literary Register (1835–1836)
 St. Joseph Gazette(1845–1988)
 St. Louis Globe-Democrat (1852-19869)
 St. Louis Republic 
 St. Louis Sun (1989–1990)

Montana
 Copper Commando
 The Daily Missoulian (Missoula) (1904–1961)

Nebraska
 Alliance Herald (1895–1922)
 Bellevue Gazette (1856–1858)
 The Capital City Courier – Lincoln (1887–1893)
 Cherry County Independent – Valentine (1892–1896)
 Columbus Journal (1878–1911)
 The Commoner – Lincoln (1901–1922)
 The Conservative – Lincoln (1898–1902)
 The Courier – Lincoln (1899–1910)
 Custer County Republican – Broken Bow (1887–1893)
 Dakota City Herald (1859–1860)
 The Falls City Tribune (1904–1908)
 Heartland Messenger – Omaha (2006–2008) 
 Hesperian Student – Lincoln (1844–1890)
 Lincoln County Tribune – North Platte (1885–1890) 
 The McCook Tribune (1885–1912)
 McCook weekly tribune (1883–1885)
 Nebraska Advertiser – Brownville (1856–1899)
 The Nebraska Advertiser – Nemaha City (1899–1908) 
 Nebraska Palladium – St. Mary, Iowa (1854–1855)
 The Norfolk Weekly News-Journal – Norfolk (1900–1912)
 The Norfolk Weekly News – Norfolk (1899–1900)
 The North Platte Semi-Weekly Tribune – North Platte (1895–1922)
 The North Platte Tribune – North Platte (1890–1894)
 Omaha Daily Bee – Omaha (1872–1927; Omaha Bee-News, 1927–1937) 
 Omaha Sun – Omaha (1951–1983) 
 Ozvěna západu – Clarkson (1914–1917)
 The Plattsmouth Daily Herald – Plattsmouth (1883–1892) 
 The Plattsmouth Herald – Plattsmouth (1892–1910) 
 The Plattsmouth Journal – Plattsmouth (1821–1939) 
 The Plattsmouth Weekly Herald – Plattsmouth (1865–1900) 
 The Plattsmouth Weekly Journal – Plattsmouth (1890–1901) 
 Přítel lidu – Wahoo (1895–1904) 
 The Red Cloud Chief (1873–1923)
 Saturday Morning Courier – Lincoln (1893–1894)
 Semi-Weekly News-Herald – Plattsmouth (1894–1898) 
 Sunday Morning Courier – Lincoln (1893–1893)
 Valentine Democrat – Valentine (1900–1912)
 The Valentine Democrat – Valentine (1896–1898)
 Western news-Democrat – Valentine (1898–1900) 
 Wilberské listy – Wilber (1905–1914) 
 The huntsman's echo – Wood River (1860–1861)

Nevada
 Tonopah Daily Bonanza (1906–1929)

New Hampshire
 The Granite Monthly
 Morning Star (Dover)
 New Hampshire Weekly 
 Laconia Citizen

New Jersey
 The Armenian Reporter (Paramus) (2006-?)
 Atlantic City Jewish Record (1939–1996)
 Carteret Press (1922-1965)
 Centinel of Freedom (Newark) (1796-1823)
 The Daily Journal (Elizabeth) (1960-1992)
 Daily Advance (Dover) (1965-1985)
 Dover Advance (1903-1914) (1923-1965)
 Dover Advance and the Iron Era (1914-1923)
 The Elizabeth Daily Journal (1868-1960)
 Madison Weekly Eagle (1882–1891)
 Morning Star (Newark) 
 Newark Evening News (1989–1990)
 The Newark Gazette (1799-1804)
 Newark Ledger 
 Paterson Evening News (1890–1987)
 Paterson Morning Call (1885-1977)
 Paterson Morning News 
 Paterson Press-Guardian 
 Vineland Independent (1867-1931)

New Mexico
 Alamogordo News (1899–1912)
 Albuquerque Tribune (1890–1987)
 Carlsbad Current (1908–1926)
 Carrizozo Outlook (1910–1945)
 The Chieftain (Socorro) (1890–1901)
 The Cimarron News and Cimarron Citizen (19??-19??)
 Clayton Citizen (1906–19??)
 Estancia News-Herald (1912–19?)
 Estancia News (1904–1912)
 Evening Herald (Albuquerque) (1914–1922)
 El Farol (Capitan, New Mexico) (1905–?)
 Hispano-Americano (Belen) (19??)
 El Independiente (Las Vegas) (1894-19??)
 Lincoln County Leader (White Oaks, New Mexico) (1882-189?)
 Mesilla Valley Independent (Mesilla) (1877–1879)
 Morning News (Estancia) (1911–1912)
 Las Nuevas de la Estancia (Estancia) (1904–1908)
 El Nuevo Mexicano (Santa Fe) (1890–1958)
 La Revista de Taos and the Taos Cresset (Taos, New Mexico) (1905–1905)
 La Revista de Taos (1905–1922)
 Santa Fe Gazette (1859–1864)
 El Grito del Norte (Española)
 Santa Fe New Mexican (1898–1951) 
 Spanish American (Roy) (19??-19??)
 Western Liberal (Lordsburg) (1887–1919)

New York
 Bronxville Press (Westchester County, 1925–1937)
 Brooklyn Daily 
 Brooklyn Citizen (1887–1947)
 Brooklyn Eagle (1841–1955)
 Brooklyn Weekly 
 Buffalo Courier-Express (Buffalo, 1926–1987)
 Buffalo Enquirer
 Canisteo Times, Canisteo, weekly, ceased about 1958
 Citizen Sentinel (Westchester County, 1919–32)
 Daily Graphic (New York City, 1873–1889)
 Dziennik Dla Wszystkich (Buffalo) (1907–1957)
 Elmira Evening News (1894–1907)
 Elmira Gazette and Free Press (1885–1907)
 Elmira Star-Gazette (1907–1963)
 Elmira Telegram (1888-192?)
 The Evening News (Newburgh, 1961–1990)
 Freie Arbeiter Stimme (New York City)
 Long Island Press (Jamaica, New York) (1921–1977)
 Nassau Daily Review-Star 
 The Merchant's Ledger (New York City) ?-1851
 National Guardian/The Guardian (New York City, 1948–1992)
 New York Age (New York City)
 New York Courier and Enquirer (1834, New York City) 
 New York Daily Column (New York City, late 1960s) 
 New York Daily Mirror (New York City) (1924-1963)
 New York Evening Journal (New York City) 1896–1937
 New York Herald (New York City) 1835-1924
 New York Herald Tribune (New York City) (1924–1966)
 New York Journal American (New York City) (1937–1966)
 New York Ledger (New York City) 1851–1903
 New York Morning News (New York City) (1844–46) 
 New York Morning Telegraph (New York City, merged with Daily Racing Form)
 New-York Tribune (New York City) (1866–1924)
 New York National Democrat (New York City, 1850s) 
 New York Star (New York City) 
 The New York Sun (New York City) (2002–2008)
 New York Sunday News (New York City 1866-19??)
 New-York Weekly Journal (New York City, est. 1733) 
 New York World (New York City) (1883–1931)
 New York World Journal Tribune (New York City) (1966–1967)
 New York World-Telegram (New York City) (1931–1966)
 The North Star (1847–1851, abolitionist, Rochester)
 Open Air PM (New York City, 1990s)
 PM (New York City) (1940–1948)
 Il Progresso Italo-Americano (1880–1988)
 Rochester Daily American 
 The Sun (New York City) (1833–1950)
 Syracuse Herald-Journal (1925–2001)
 Troy News 
 Utica Saturday Globe (Utica, New York, 1881–1924)
 Weekly Anglo-African (1861, New York City) 
 Yonkers Herald (1892-1932)

North Carolina

North Dakota
 Bismarck Daily Tribune (1881-1916)
 Jamestown Weekly Alert (Jamestown) (1882–1925)
 Neche Chronotype (1897–1928)
 Northern Express (Drayton) (1881–1883)
 Pembina County Chronotype-Express (Neche) (1929–1932)
 Pembina Pioneer (1879–1882)
 Pioneer Express (Pembina) (1883–1928)
 Sioux County Arrow (Fort Yates) (1928–1929)
 Sioux County Pioneer (Fort Yates) (1914–1929)
 Sioux County Pioneer-Arrow (Fort Yates) (1929–1967)
 Ward County Independent (Minot) (1902–1965)
 Washburn Leader (1890–1986)
 Wilton News (1899–1986)
 Wing Press (Wing, N.D.) (1951)

Ohio
 The Akron Press joined in 1925 with Akron Times to be  The Akron Times-Press.
 Celina Democrat (1895–1921)
 Cincinnati Herald
 The Cincinnati Post (1881–2007)
 Cincinnati Times-Star (1880–1958)
 Cincinnati Volksfreund
 Cleveland Leader 
 Cleveland News (1905-1960)
 Cleveland Press (1878-1982)
 Commercial Register (Sandusky) (1859–1869)
 The Columbus Citizen-Journal (1959–1985)
 Columbus Star
 Daily Register (Sandusky) (1856–1859)
 Dayton Journal-Herald
 Evening and Morning Star (Kirtland)
 The Jackson County Times-Journal (Jackson) (?-2018)
 Penny Evening Telegram (Springfield) (1860s)
 The Philanthropist (Cincinnati) (1836–1843)
 Sandusky Clarion (1822–1852)
 Sandusky News (?-1941)
 Sandusky Star-Journal (?-1929)
 Springfield Republic 
 Tägliches Cincinnati Volksblatt (1836–1919)
 Toledo News-Bee
 Toledo Commercial (1892–1900)
 Toledo Times (1900–1975)

Oklahoma
 Branding Iron (Atoka) (1884–1884)
 Cheyenne Transporter (Darlington Agency) (1879–1886)
 Daily Chieftain (Vinita) (1898–1902)
 Indian Advocate (Sacred Heart) (?-1910)
 Indian Chieftain (Vinita) (1882–1902)
 The Oklahoma (City) Times (1889–1984)
 Tulsa Tribune(1919–1992)
 Vinita Daily Chieftain (Vinita) (1902–1913)

Oregon
See List of defunct newspapers in Oregon

 Brownsville Times (1889–1960)

 Bulletin (Grants Pass) (1949–1960, 1964–1970)

 Commonwealth (Harrisburg) (191?–1916)

 Daily Grants Pass Courier aka Rogue River Daily Courier (1886–1934)

 Grants Pass Bulletin (1927–1949; 1960–1964)
 Greater Oregon (Halsey) (1929–1978)

 Halsey Enterprise (1927–1929)
 Halsey Journal (1932–1938)
 Halsey Review (1938–1963)

 The Oregon Journal (Portland)
 Oregon Observer (Grants Pass) (18??-1927)

 Portland Evening Journal
 Portland News-Telegram
 Portland Reporter

 Southern Oregon Spokesman (1924–1927)

 Toveritar Astoria, Oregon (?-1930)

Pennsylvania

 Adams Centinel (sic) (Gettysburg) (1800–1805 & 1813–1826) 
 Adams County Independent (Littlestown) (189?–1943)
 Adams County News (Gettysburg) (1908–1917)
 Advance (Philadelphia) (1887-190?)
 Advocate (Philadelphia) (1890–?)
 Advocate (Pittsburgh) (1832–1844)

 Afro-American (Philadelphia) (1934–1937)

 Age (Philadelphia) (1866–1874)
 Agents' Herald (Philadelphia) (1877–1896)
 Agitator (Wellsborough) (1854–1865)

 Alexander's Express Messenger (Philadelphia) (1844–1846)
 All-day City Item (Philadelphia) (1872–1875)
 Alleghanian (Ebensburg) (1859–1865)
 Allegheny Mountain Echo and Johnstown Commercial Advertiser and Intelligencer (Johnstown) (1853–1861)
 Allentown Chronicle and News and Evening Item (1921–1923)
 Allentown Critic (1884–1889)
 Allentown Daily Leader (1893–1903)
 Allentown Evening Item (1915–1921)
 Allied Mercury: or The Independent Intelligencer (Philadelphia) (1781–1781)
 Alt Berks, der Stern im Osten (Reading) (1840–1844)
 Die Alte und Die neue Welt (Philadelphia) (1834-18??)

 America (Philadelphia) (19??-2013)
 American Advocate (Philadelphia) (1844–1845)
 American Eagle and Philadelphia County Democrat (Philadelphia) (1836–????)
 American Guardian (Philadelphia) (186?–1870)
 American Patriot (Bellefonte) (1814–1817)
 American Pioneer, and Fireman's Chronicle (Philadelphia) (1831–1833)
 American Reformer and Pennsylvania State Temperance Organ (Harrisburg) (184?–18??)
 American Saturday Courier) (1851–1856)
 American Weekly Mercury (Philadelphia) (1719–1749)
 Amerikanischer Correspondent für das In-und Ausland (Philadelphia) (1825–1829)
 Amerikanischer Republikaner (Pottsville) (1855–1909)
 Amerikanskij Russkij Sokol Sojedinenija (Homestead) (1926–1936)
 Amerikansky Russky Viestnik (Scranton) (189?–1952)
 American Standard (Harrisburg) (1847-18??)

 Anti-Masonic Star, and Republican Banner (Gettysburg) (1830–1831)
 Der Anti-Freimaurer, und Lecha Caunty Patriot (Allentown) (1829–1831)
 Anti-Masonic State Democrat (Harrisburg) (183?–183?)
 Anthracite Monitor (Tamaqua) (1871–1875)

 Ashland Advocate (1867–1920)
 Ashland Daily News (191?–1966)
 Ashland Record (1872–1909)

 Arthur's Home Gazette (Philadelphia) (1850–1855)

 Atkinson's Saturday Evening Post (Philadelphia) (1833–1839)

 Austin Autograph (1887–1911)
 Austin Messenger (1916–????)
 Austin Republican (1898–1906)

 Avoca Times (1889–1890)

 Bache's Philadelphia Aurora (1797–1800)
 Baner America (Scranton) (1868–1877)
 Banner von Berks, und Wochenblatt der Reading Post (Reading) (1878–1909)
 Barnesboro Eagle (1917–1924)
 Barnesborský Orol (Barnesboro) (1914–1920)
 Barthe's Weekly Star (Plymouth) (1891–1895)

 Beacon (Philadelphia) (1940–1961)
 Bellefonte Advertiser (1867–1869)
 Bellefonte Morning News (1880-19??)
 Bellefonte National (1868–1870)
 Bellefonte Republican (1869–1909)
 Berks and Schuylkill Journal (Reading) (1816–1910)
 Berks Caunty Adler (Reading) (1826–183?)
 Berks County Free Press (Reading) (1830–1835)
 Berks County Press (Reading) (1847–1865)
 Berks County Record (Reading) (1959–19??)
 Berks County Reporter (Reading) (1967–19??)

 Bicknell's Reporter, Counterfeit Detector, and Philadelphia Prices Current (1835–1857)
 Die Biene (Reading) (1867–1913)
 Bituminous Record (Philipsburg) (1885–1907)

 Blade (Scranton) (1888–1892)
 The Blue Stocking (Harrisburg) (1842–1844)

 Bomb-Shell (Harrisburg) (1848-18??)
 Borough Item (Harrisburg) (1852–1854)

 Bradford Reporter (Towanda) (1844–1884)
 Bratstvo (Wilkes-Barre) (1944-199?)

 Call (Schuylkill Haven) (1903–1951)
 Cambria Dispatch (Portage) (1929–1948)
 Cambria Freeman (Ebensburg) (1867–1938)
 Cambria Gazette (Johnstown) (1841–1853)
 Cambria Herald (Ebensburg) (1871–1898)
 Cambria Tribune (Johnstown) (1853–1864)
 Campaigner (Bellefonte) (1867–?)
 Capitolian (Harrisburg) (1842-18??)
 Carbondale Advance (18??-1889)
 Carbondale Advance and Jermyn Advocate (1889–1899)
 Carbondale Leader (1872–1944)
 Carbondale Transcript, and Lackawanna Journal (1851–1857)
 Carbondale Weekly Advance (1861-18??)
 Carrolltown News (1883–1950)
 Catholic Record (Scranton) (1887–1890)

 Der Centre Berichter (Aaronsburg) (1827–1847)
 Centre Democrat (Bellefonte) (1848–1989)
 Centre Reporter (Centre Hall) (1871–1940)
 Century (Gettysburg) (1874–1878)

 Der Christliche Botschafter (New-Berlin) (1836–1946)
 Die Christliche Zeitschrift (Gettysburg) (1838–1848)
 Chronicle, and Harrisburg Advertiser (Harrisburg) (1818–1820)
 Chronicle of the Times (Reading) (1823–1831)
 Chronicle, or, Harrisburgh Visitor (Harrisburg) (1813–1818)
 Church Advocate (Lancaster) (1846–1981)

 Citizen (Honesdale) (1908–1914)
 Citizen-Standard (1942–1966)

 Clearfield Citizen (1878–1885)
 Clearfield County Times (Curwensville) (1872–1884)
 Clearfield Democrat (1833–1839)
 Clearfield Progress (1913–1946)
 Clearfield Republican (1851–1937)
 Clearfield Times (1937–1944)

 Coaldale Observer (Coaldale) (1910–1958)
 Coalport Standard (1884–1934)
 Comet (Bellefonte) (1857-18??)
 Commercial Journal (Pittsburgh)
 Commonwealth (Pittsburgh)
 Commonwealth (Harrisburg) (1897-1???)
 Commonwealth (Tionesta) (1880–1885)
 Compiler (Gettysburg) (1857–1866)
 Coudersport Democrat (1898–????)
 Country Dollar (Clearfield) (1849–1851)
 Country Mirror and Lackawannian (Scranton) (1845–1847)
 County Review (Curwensville) (1882–1910)
 Courier (Harrisburg) (1903–1924)
 Country Impressions (Sweet Valley) (1965–1974)
 Country Mirror and Lackawannian (Scranton) (1845–1847)
 Courier Herald (Wilkes-Barre) (1894–1953)

 Cresson Gallitzin Mainliner (1975–1999)
 Cross Fork News (1902–1906)
 Crystal Fountain and Pennsylvania Temperance Journal (Harrisburg) (1853–1856)

 Curwensville Herald (1915–1944)

 Daily American (Harrisburg) (1850–1851)
 Daily Bulletin (Hazleton) (1879–1893)
 Daily Chronicle and News (Allentown) (1883–1895)
 Daily Dawn (Harrisburg) (187?–18??)
 Daily Democrat (Scranton) (1869-187?)
 Daily Evening Mercury (Harrisburg) (1873–1874)
 Daily Intelligencer (Harrisburg) (1841–1847)
 Daily Legislative Union (Harrisburg) (1854-185?)
 Daily News (Hazleton) (1870–1875)
 Daily News-Dealer (Wilkes-Barre) (1889–1894)
 Daily Public Spirit (Clearfield) (1901–1920)
 Daily Record of the Times (Wilkes-Barre) (1873–1876)
 Daily Review (Reading) (1895–1899)
 Daily Sentinel (Hazleton) (1869–1879)
 Daily Times (Scranton) (1874–1883)
 Dauphin Caunty Journal (Harrisburg) (1877–1887)

 Demokratischer Wächter, Luzerne und Columbia County Anzeiger (Wilkes-Barre) (18??-1909)
 Deutsch-Amerikanischer Volks-Freund (Wilkes-Barre) (1880–1884)
 Deutsches Wochenblatt (Abbottstaun [sic]) (1848-18??)

 Di Idishe Shṭime (Reading) (1922–1929)
 Diocesan Record (Scranton) (1890-190?)

 Dollar Weekly News (Scranton) (18??-18??)

 Draugas (Wilkes-Barre) (1909–1916)
 The Druid (Scranton) (1907–1914)

 DuBois Daily Express (1909–1927)
 DuBois Courier Express (1947–1964)
 DuBois Weekly Courier (1882–1917)

 East Berlin News (East Berlin) (1893–1925)
 East Berlin news and Biglerville News (East Berlin) (1925–1930)
 East Penn Free Press (Emmaus) (1984–1988)

 Echo Polskie (Kingston) (1927-19??)

 Elk Advocate (Ridgway) (186?–1868)

 Evening Chronicle (Allentown)
 Evening Express (DuBois) (1892–1909)
 Evening Gazette (Pittston) (1882–1900)
 Evening Herald (Shenandoah) (1891–1966)
 Evening Leader (Wilkes-Barre) (1884–1898)
 Evening News (Wilkes-Barre) (1909–1939)
 Evening Public Ledger (Philadelphia) (1914–1942)

 Exeter Echo (1939–1956)

 Farmers' and Mechanics' Journal (Gettysburg) (1842-18??)

 Fest-Zeitung (Scranton) (1884-18??)

 Forest Republican (Tionesta) (1869–1952)

 Free Lance (State College) (1887–1904)
 Freeland Progress (1881–1890)
 Free Patrol (Scranton) (1877-18??)
 Free Press (Emmaus) (1980–1984)

 Galeton Dispatch (1896–1903)
 Galeton Democrat (1903–1909)
 Garfield Thomas Watertunnel (University Park) (1969)
 Gazette of the United States, & Philadelphia Daily Advertiser (Philadelphia) (1796–1800)

 Genesee Times (1899–1902 & 1903–1914)
 Gettysburg Compiler (Gettysburg) (1866–1961)
 Gettysburg Star (Gettysburg) (1864–1867)
 Gettysburg Truth (Gettysburg) (1887–1891)

 Gleaner (Wilkes-Barre) (1812–1818)
 Glen Summit Breeze (1893–1902)

 Górnik (Wilkes-Barre) (192?–194?)

 Greater Hazleton Mirror (1972-19??)

 Gwerinwr Cymreig (Scranton) 18??-?)
 Gwiazda (Philadelphia) (1902–1985)

 Harrisburg Telegraph (1879–1948)
 Hazleton Journal (1936-19??)
 Hazleton Patriot (1975-19??)
 Hazleton Sentinel (1866–1880)
 Hazleton Standard-Speaker (1961–1980)
 Das Hazleton Volksblatt (1872–1906)

 Herald of the Union (Scranton) (1856-186?)
 Der Herold (Scranton) (187?-?)
 The Hershey Chronicle 
 The Hershey News 
 The Hershey Press 

 Highland Patriot (Coudersport) (1854–1858)

 Honesdale Democrat (1844–1864)
 Houtzdale Citizen (1900–1934)
 Houtzdale Citizen and Coalport Standard (1934–1942)
 Houtzdale Observer (1882–1899)
 Howard Hustler (1898–1915)
 Howard Weekly Hornet (1894–1898)

 Hyde Park Item and Real Estate Journal (Scranton) (1874-18??)

 Index (Scranton) (1887–1899)
 Industrial Advocate (Scranton) (1877–1878)
 Investigator (East-Berlin) (1844-18??)

 Jednota (Scranton) (1902–1904)
 Jeffersonian (Littlestown) (1899-190?)
 Jewish Journal of the Anthracite Region (Wilkes-Barre) (193?–193?)

 Journal (White Haven) (1900–1981)

 Keystone Gazette (Bellefonte) (1937–1959)

 Kingston Times (188?–1???)

 Lackawanna Herald and American Advocate (Scranton) (185?-?)
 Lackawanna Intelligencer (Scranton) (1882–1886)
 Lackawanna Register (Scranton) (1863-186?) 
 La Libera Parola (Philadelphia) (1918–1969)

 Leader-Courier (Osceola Mills) (1890–1922)
 Leader-Dispatch (Galeton) (1903–1958)
 Lebanon Semi-Weekly News 
 Der Lecha Caunty Patriot (Allentown) (1859–1872)
 Der Lecha Patriot und Northampton Demokrat (Allentown) (1839–1848)
 Lehigh Regiater (Allentown), 1846–1912

 Der Liberale Beobachter und Berks, Montgomery und Schuylkill Caunties Allgemeine Anzeiger (Reading) (1839–1864)
 Light on the Hill (Scranton) (1873-18??)
 Literary Visitor (Wilkes-Barre) (1813–1815)
 Littlestown News (1874–1878)

 Luzerne Federalist and Susquehannah Intelligencer (Wilkes-Barre) (1801–1809)
 Luzerne Union (Wilkes-Barre) (1853–1879)

 Marienville Express (1890–1952)

 McKeesport Daily News 

 Millheim Journal (Millheim) (1876–1984)
 Il Minatore (Scranton) (1912–1940)

 Monitor (Clearfield) (1892–1905)
 Montgomery County Record
 Mountaineer (Curwensville) (1903–1915)
 Mountain Times (Bellefonte) (1918–1933)

 Multum in Parvo, and Plain Talker (Clearfield) (1833–1885)

 Narodna voli︠a︡ (Scranton) (1910–?)
 National Gazette and Literary Register (Philadelphia)

 New Oxford Item (1879–1967)
 News (Cross Fork) (1897–1902)
 News Comet (East Berlin) (1930–1952)

 Oswayo Valley Mail (Shingle House) (1901–1962)
 Oswayo Valley Record (1900–1902)

 Palladium (Shinglehouse) (1882–1884)
 The Patriot (Indiana) (1914–1955)
 The Patriot (Harrisburg) (1891–1996)

 Penn State Collegian (State College) (1911–1940)
 Pennsylvania Chronicle (Philadelphia) (1767-?)
 The Pennsylvania Journal (Philadelphia) (1742-?)
 Pennsylvania Mirror (State College) (1968–1977)
 True American (Philadelphia) (?)
 Pennsylvania Packet (Philadelphia) (?)
 Pennsylvanische Staats Zeitung (Harrisburg) (1843–1887)

 The People (Scranton) (1886–1892)
 People's Journal (Coudersport) (1850–1857)
 Petroleum Centre Daily Record (1868–1873)

 Philadelphia Afro-American (1937–1965)
 Philadelphia Aurora
 Philadelphia Bulletin (1847–1982)
 Philadelphia Demokrat
 Philadelphia Evening Telegraph
 Philadelphia Journal (1977–1981)
 Philadelphia North American
 Philadelphia Press (1885–1920)

 Philadelphia Record (1877–1947)
 Pittsburgh Commercial
 Pittsburgh Dispatch
 Pittsburgh Leader
 Pittsburgh Mercury
 Pittsburgh Press (1884–1992)
 Pittsburgh Sun-Telegraph (1927–1960)
 The Pittsburg Times
 Pittsburgh Tribune-Review (print edition 1992–2016)

 Polish American Journal (Scranton) (1948–1972)
 Potter County journal (Coudersport) (1880–1969)
 Potter Democrat (Coudersport) (1893–1919)
 Potter Enterprise (Coudersport) (1950–1987 & 1931–1950)
 Potter Journal (Coudersport) (1857–1872)
 Potter Pioneer (Coudersport) (1843–1851)

 Press (Philadelphia) (1880–1885)
 Providence Echo (Scranton) (1879–1881)
 Potter enterprise and the Potter Independent (Coudersport) (1920–1931)

 Public Ledger (Philadelphia) (1836–1942)

 Quakertown Free Press

 La Ragione (Philadelphia) (1917–?)
 La Rassegna (Philadelphia) (1917–?)

 Republic (Honesdale) (1864–1868)
 Republican Compiler (Gettysburg) (1818–1857)

 Roulette Recorder (1903–1919)

 Sprig of Liberty (Gettysburg) (1804–1807)

 Tribune-Republican (Scranton) (1910–1915)

 Scranton Republican (1877–1910)
 Scranton Tribune (1891–1910)
 Scranton Wochenblatt (Scranton) (1865–1918)

 Sokol Sojedinenija = Sokol Soedynenii︠a︡ (Homestead) (1914–1926)

 Star (Scranton) (1871-18??)
 Star and Banner (Gettysburg) (1847–1864)
 Star and Republican Banner (Gettysburg) (1832–1847)
 Star-Independent (Harrisburg) (1904–1917)
 State College Times (1932–1934)

 Sunbury American (1848–1879)
 The Sunday Morning News (Scranton) (1878–1901)
 Sunday News (Wilkes-Barre) (1899–1904)
 Sunday News Dealer (Wilkes-Barre) (1833–1898)
 Der Susquehanna Beobachter, und Luzerne und Columbia Caunty Advertiser (Wilkesbarre) (1826–1830)

 Times (State College) (1898–1932)

 True Democrat (Wilkes-Barre) (1852–1854)
 True Republic (Scranton) (1882-1???)

 Turtle Creek Independent

 Ulysses Sentinel (1881–1916)

 Der Vaterlands-Wächter (Harrisburg) (18??-1876)

 Wage-earner's Journal (Philipsburg) (1885–1907)
 Wayne Citizen (Honesdale) (1868–1873)

 Weekly Press (Philadelphia) (1857–1861, 1883–1905)
 West Oak Lane Beacon (Philadelphia) (1951–1965)
 West Philadelphia Saturday Star (Philadelphia) (1860–1872)
 West Philadelphia Times (Philadelphia) (1924–1946)
 West Side Progress (Scranton) (1884-18??)

 Whig State Journal (Harrisburg) (1851–1853)

 Wilkes-Barre Times Leader (1907–1939, 1978–1982)
 Wilkes-Barre Weekly Times (1894–1904)

 Workingman (Pottsville) (1873–1876)

 Wyoming Herald (Wilkes-Barre) (1818–1835)
 Wyoming Observer (1967–1970)
 Wyoming Republican (Kingston) (1832–1835)
 Wyoming Valley Observer (1970–1979)

Puerto Rico
 El Imparcial (San Juan)
 El Mundo  (San Juan)
 El Reportero (San Juan)

Rhode Island
 Providence Evening Bulletin (1863–1995)

South Carolina
 Abbeville Medium (1871–1923)
 Abbeville Press (1860–1869)
 American General Gazette
 Anderson Gazette (1843–1854)
 Charleston Mercury (1819–1868)
 Columbia Record (1897–1988)
 Deutsche Zeitung (Charleston) (1853–1917) 
 Evening Medium (Abbeville) (1923–1925)
 The Evening Post
 Gazette and Advocate (Anderson) (1855-185?)
 The Greenville Piedmont
 Herald and News (Newberry) (1903–1937)
 Highland Sentinel (Calhoun) (1840–1843)
 Press and Banner (Abbeville) (1924–1925)
 The South-Carolina
 Southern Rights Advocate (Anderson) (1852-185?)

South Dakota
 Dakota Farmers' Leader (Canton) (1890-19??)

Tennessee
 Afro – American Sentinel (Jackson) (1890–1891?)
 Chattanooga Daily Rebel  
 Chattanooga Times (1869-1999)
 The Commercial Bulletin (1880-?) (Jackson)
 Memphis Avalanche (1866–1885)
 Memphis Daily Appeal (1847–1886)
 Memphis Daily Commercial (1889–1891)
 Memphis Morning News (1902–1904)
 Memphis Press Scimitar (1907–1983)
 Nashville American 
 Nashville Banner (1876–1998)
 The Nashville City Paper (2000–2013)
 Tennessee Staatszeitung (Nashville) (1866-187?)
 Wochenblatt der Tennessee Staatszeitung Nashville (1867–1867)

Texas
 A.M. Journal Express (Dallas)
 Brazos Pilot (Bryan) (1877–1913)
 Bryan Daily Eagle and Pilot (1909–1918)
 Cedar Creek Pilot (Gun Barrel City) (?-2011)
 Dallas Dispatch-Journal(1906–1938)
 Dallas Herald
 Dallas Journal (1914–1942)
 Dallas Times Herald (1879–1991)
 El Democrata Fronterizo (Laredo) (1896–1920)
 El Paso Herald-Post
 Fort Worth Press
 Houston Evening Journal (−1885) 
 Houston Morning Chronicle (−1885) 
 Houston Post (1880–1995)
 Houston Press (1911–1964)
 Jewish Monitor (Fort Worth) (191?–1921)
 San Antonio Gazette (1904–1911) 
 San Antonio Evening News (1918–1984) 
 San Antonio Light (1881–1993)

Utah
 The Broad Ax (Salt Lake City) (1895-19??)
Goodwin's Weekly (Salt Lake City) 1902–1929
 Intermountain Catholic (Salt Lake City) (1899–1920)
 Iron County Record (Cedar City) (1893–1982)
 Salt Lake Herald (1870–1909)
 Salt Lake Telegram (1915–1952)
 Topaz Times (1942–1945)
 Truth (Salt Lake City) (1901–1908)

Vermont
 Bennington Evening Banner (?-1961)
 Cronaca sovversiva (Barre) (1903–1920)
 Le Patriote Canadien (Burlington) (1839–1840)

Virginia
 Alexandria Gazette (1834-1974)
 Arlington Daily (1939-1951)
 Arlington Sun
 The Hook (Charlottesville) (2002-2013)
 News & Messenger
 Port Folio Weekly
 Richmonder Anzeiger (1854-18??)
 Richmond Chronicle (1969-197?)
 Richmond Enquirer
 The Richmond News Leader (1888–1992)
 Richmond Planet (1883–1938)
 The Richmond State
 Richmond Whig

Washington
 Columbia Basin News
 Seattle Post-Intelligencer (print edition 1863-2009, online only edition 2009-)
 The Seattle Star (1899–1947)
 Seattle Union Record
 Spokane Daily Chronicle

Washington, DC

 The Bee (1882–1884)
 The Colored American
 Daily National Era (1854–1854)
 Daily News (1921–1972)
 National Intelligencer 
 National Forum (1910-19??)
 New National Era (1870–1874)
 Voice of the Hill 
 Washington Globe 
 Washington Herald (1906-1939)
 Washington Star (1852-1981)
 Washington Times-Herald (1939–1954)

West Virginia
 Charleston Daily Mail
 Charleston Gazette
 Huntington Advertiser ? – 1979)
 Richwood News Leader 
 La Sentinella del West Virginia (Thomas) (1905–1913)
 Virginia Argus and Hampshire Advertiser
 West Virginia Hillbilly

Wisconsin
 Green Bay News-Chronicle (1972–2005)
 La Crosse Democrat
 Milwaukee Advertiser
 Milwaukee Herold
 Milwaukee Journal (1882-1995)
 Milwaukee Sentinel (1837-1995)
 Milwaukee Telegram
 The Paper for Central Wisconsin (Oshkosh) 
 Wisconsin News

Footnotes

Further reading
 Montana Historical Society Newspaper Project, Union List of Montana Newspapers in Montana Repositories," Montana Historical Society, December 1986.

External links
 U.S. Newspaper Directory, 1690–present – sponsored jointly by the National Endowment for the Humanities and the Library of Congress
 Newspaper Death Watch

 
Defunct